Dan Chisena (born February 25, 1997) is an American football wide receiver for the Pittsburgh Steelers of the National Football League (NFL). He played college football at Penn State.

Early life and high school
Chisena was born in Paoli, Pennsylvania and grew up in Downingtown, Pennsylvania. He attended Downingtown East High School, where he played football and was a sprinter on the track team. He was named first-team All-Ches-Mont League as a senior in football after catching 41 passes for 553 yards and three touchdowns. In track, Chisena won gold in the 100 meters, 200 meters and 4x100 relay at the 2015 PIAA Class AAA Outdoor State Championship.

College career
Chisena joined both the football and track teams as a walk-on and redshirted as a freshman. He was offered a track scholarship at the end of his freshman year and left the football team due NCAA rules. In track, Chisena came in third at the 2017 Big Ten Conference Outdoor Championships in the 400-meter and was part of the team that won the 4x400 relay at the 2017 Indoor Championships. After tearing his hamstring in early 2018, Chisena left the track team after two seasons in order to return to the football team.

Chisena played in two games in his first season with the football team as a junior. He was awarded a football scholarship for his final season during the team's spring game, which he caught a 59-yard touchdown pass in. As a senior, he played in all twelve of the Nittany Lions' games and caught three passes for 66 yards.

Professional career

Minnesota Vikings
Chisena was signed by the Minnesota Vikings as an undrafted free agent on April 26, 2020. Chisena made the Vikings' 53-man active roster out of training camp, primarily for his special teams potential and his versatility, as he was  converted to safety. Chisena made his NFL debut in the season opener on September 13, 2020 against the Green Bay Packers, playing on special teams. Chisena recovered a fumble on a muffed punt by DeAndre Carter on October 4, 2020 in a 31-23 win over the Houston Texans. Chisena played in 14 games as a rookie, playing exclusively on special teams and finishing the year with six tackles and a fumble recovery.

On September 1, 2021, Chisena was placed on injured reserve. He was activated, then waived on October 9, 2021. He was re-signed to the active roster on October 12.

On August 30, 2022, Chisena was waived by the Vikings. He was signed to the practice squad one day later.

Pittsburgh Steelers
On January 23, 2023, Chisena signed a reserve/future contract with the Pittsburgh Steelers.

References

External links
Penn State Nittany Lions bio
Minnesota Vikings bio

1997 births
Living people
American football wide receivers
Penn State Nittany Lions football players
Minnesota Vikings players
Penn State Nittany Lions men's track and field athletes
People from Paoli, Pennsylvania
Pittsburgh Steelers players
Players of American football from Pennsylvania
Sportspeople from Chester County, Pennsylvania
Track and field athletes from Pennsylvania